"Sorrow's Army" is the first single from Graham Coxon's seventh studio album The Spinning Top. The single was to be released on May 18, 2009, a week after the album, by Transgressive Records. "Sorrow's Army" was Zane Lowe's Hottest Record on March 11, 2009. The music video, one of two —the other being In The Morning— filmed on the same weekend, was directed and filmed by Nick Craske.

References

2009 singles
Graham Coxon songs
Song recordings produced by Stephen Street
2009 songs
Transgressive Records singles